The Tamina is a river in Switzerland that originates on the flanks of Piz Sardona in the Glarus Alps and flows eastwards and northwards to finally merge with the Alpine Rhine after about 18 km total length.

Along its way it flows into the reservoir Lake Gigerwald in the Calfeisen valley.  At Vättis it is joined by the Gorbsbach, and flows northeast into the Mapraggsee.  The lower section, heading northwards through Bad Pfäfers, forms a deep and narrow gorge called the Taminaschlucht.  Finally, it meets the Rhine river near Bad Ragaz.

Historically, the Tamina valley (Taminatal, also Vättnertal) was owned by the Pfäfers Abbey, joined to the canton of St. Gallen at its formation in 1803.

References 

Rivers of Switzerland
Rivers of the canton of St. Gallen